The Okulovsky mine is a large mine in the south of Belarus in Gomel Region. Okulovsky represents one of the largest iron reserve in Belarus having estimated reserves of 1 billion tonnes of ore grading 26% iron.

References 

Iron mines in Belarus
Mines in the Soviet Union